Presidents Day, Presidents' Day, and President's Day is the informal name of a holiday held in many areas of United States that celebrates any or all US Presidents. It is held on the third Monday in February (the same day as the federal holiday Washington's Birthday).

Presidents Day may also refer to:
 Presidents' Day (Equatorial Guinea), a holiday celebrated on June 5.
 Presidents' Day (Botswana), a holiday held on the third Monday of July
 President's Day (film), a 2010 comedy horror movie

See also
 North American blizzard of 2003 or Presidents' Day Storm II